Aaron Solow is an American professional wrestler. He is currently working for the American promotion All Elite Wrestling (AEW), where he is part of the QTV stable, using the ring name Aaron Solo.

Professional wrestling career 
Solo made his debut on the independent circuit in California, notably Big Time Wrestling. On July 16, 2015 he wrestled Tyler Breeze at WWE NXT. In 2018 he wrestled Punishment Martinez for the ROH World Television Championship.

He made his AEW debut on July 15, 2020, losing to Scorpio Sky on AEW Dark. He was initially aligned with The Nightmare Family but later joined QT Marshall and The Factory, turning heel in the process. He made his AEW Dynamite debut, teaming with Nick Comoroto & QT Marshall defeating  The Nightmare Family (Billy Gunn, Dustin Rhodes and Lee Johnson).

At AEW Double Or Nothing (2021), he participated in the Casino Battle Royal. On August 10, 2022 he was defeated by his former partner Ricky Starks at Quake by the Lake.

Personal life 
Solo was previously engaged to fellow professional wrestler Bayley, whom he met in 2010. The engagement was called off on February 21, 2021.

Championships and Accomplishments 
American Combat Wrestling
ACW Tag Team Championship (3 times) - with Jason Cade
Big Time Wrestling
BTW Tag Team Championship (1 time) - with Shane Kody
Dojo Pro Wrestling
Dojo Pro Black Belt Championship (1 time)
Dojo Pro White Belt Championship (1 time)
WrestleCircus
WC Big Top Tag Team Championship (1 time) - with Ricky Starks

References

External links 

 

All Elite Wrestling personnel
Living people
Professional wrestlers from California
American male professional wrestlers
American professional wrestlers of Filipino descent
Year of birth missing (living people)
American people of Filipino descent
21st-century professional wrestlers